Ravi Rahul is an Indian actor and director, who has appeared in leading roles in films and television.

Career
Ravi Rahul was introduced as a leading actor in Kasthuri Raja's Aatha Un Koyilile (1991), before moving on to appear in further lead roles in Maangalyam Thandhunaane (1991) and Tamizh Ponnu (1992). As offers in Tamil films began to reduce, Ravi Rahul moved on to work on Tamil television serials, appearing in over 50 shows. Following an extended period away from the film industry, he made a comeback in the lead role through Pollangu (2012). The film opened to negative reviews with Ravi Rahul being criticised for his performance.

Ravi Rahul made his directorial debut through Salaam (2017). In 2018, he directed a film titled Kalavani Sirukki featuring newcomers.

Filmography 
Films

Director
Salaam (2017)
Kalavani Sirukki (2018)

References 

Living people
20th-century Indian male actors
Male actors in Tamil cinema
Year of birth missing (living people)